— W. H. Auden, from "September 1, 1939"

Nationality words link to articles with information on the nation's poetry or literature (for instance, Irish or France).

Events
 January
 Last issue of The Criterion is published
 The Kenyon Review is established by John Crowe Ransom
 January/February – Poetry London: a Bi-Monthly of Modern Verse and Criticism, founded and edited by Tambimuttu (with Dylan Thomas and others), is first published
 February 17 – Gunga Din, a film directed by George Stevens, based loosely on Rudyard Kipling's poem of the same name, is released in the United States
 June – Rolfe Humphries, a former student of Nicholas Murray Butler at Columbia University, publishes in the magazine Poetry "Draft Ode for a Phi Beta Kappa Occasion", following a classical format of blank verse with one classical reference per line but with the first letters of each line of the resulting acrostic spelling out the message "Nicholas Murray Butler is a horses [sic.] ass"; upon learning of the "hidden" message, the irate editors run an apology in the August issue
 Carl Rakosi begins a 28-year hiatus from writing poetry

Works published in English

Canada
 Arthur Bourinot, Under the Sun (1939 Governor General's Award)
Anne Marriott, The Wind Our Enemy, Toronto: Ryerson Press

India, in English
 Harindranath Chattopadhyaya, The Dark Well (Poetry in English), Madras: Kalakshetra
 Tandra Devi, Poems (Poetry in English), Srinagar: Tandra Devi Publications
 P. R. Kaikini, Shanghai (Poetry in English), Bombay: New Book Co.

New Zealand
 Ursula Bethell, Day and Night : Poems 1924-34, by the author of 'Time and Place, Christchurch: Caxton Press
 Charles Brasch, The Land and the People, and Other Poems, Christchurch: Caxton Press
 Allen Curnow, Not in Narrow Seas, Christchurch: Caxton Press

United Kingdom
 W. H. Auden and Christopher Isherwood, Journey to a War, verse and nonfiction prose, published March 16; includes "In Time of War", a sonnet sequence with verse commentary by Auden; diary and prose by Isherwood
 W. H. Auden,  "September 1, 1939", a poem written on the occasion of the outbreak of World War II, first published in The New Republic on October 18, and which will later appear in Auden's collection Another Time (1940); at this time Auden is an English poet living in the United States
 George Barker, Elegy on Spain
 Roy Campbell, Flowering Rifle: A poem from he battlefield of Spain
 W. H. Davies, The Loneliest Mountain, and Other Poems
 T. S. Eliot:
 Old Possum's Book of Practical Cats
 "The Marching Song of the Pollicle Dogs" and "Billy M'Caw: The Remarkable Parrot", contributions to The Queen's Book of the Red Cross anthology
 Gavin Ewart, Poems and Songs
 Geoffrey Grigson, editor, New Verse, anthology
 J. F. Hendry and Henry Treece, editors, The New Apocalypse, an early anthology of the New Apocalyptics poets in Britain
 A. E. Housman, Collected Poems
 Louis MacNeice, Autumn Journal
 Ruth Pitter, The Spirit Watches
 Enoch Powell, Casting-off, and Other Poems, Oxford: Blackwell’s
 Lady Margaret Sackville, Collected Poems
 Christopher Smart, Rejoice in the Lamb: A Song from Bedlam, the first publication of Smart's Jubilate Agno (written during his asylum confinement 1757–1758) edited by W. F. Stead (includes the lines beginning "For I will consider my Cat Jeoffry")
 William Soutar, In the Time of Tyrants
 Julian Symons, Confusions About X
 Dylan Thomas, The Map of Love, verse and fiction
 W. B. Yeats, Last Poems and Two Plays, Irish poet published in the United Kingdom, published posthumously in July

United States
 W. H. Auden:
 "September 1, 1939"  a poem written on the occasion of the outbreak of World War II, first published in The New Republic on October 18, and which will later appear in Auden's collection Another Time (1940); at this time Auden is an English poet living in the United States
 With Christopher Isherwood, The Journey to a War
 Stephen Vincent Benet, The Ballad of the Duke's Mercy
 Paul Engle, Corn
 Robert Frost, Collected Poems
 Archibald MacLeish, America Was Promises
 Josephine Miles, Lines at Intersection
 Edna St. Vincent Millay, Huntsman, What Quarry?
 Kenneth Patchen, First Will and Testament
 Muriel Rukeyser, A Turning Wind
 May Sarton, Inner Landscape
 Edward Taylor, The Poetical Works, edited by Thomas H. Johnson
 Mark Van Doren, Collected Poems
 Thomas Wolfe, The Face of a Nation

Other in English
 Kenneth Slessor, Five Bells: XX Poems, Sydney: F.C. Johnson, Australia
 W. B. Yeats, Last Poems and Two Plays, Irish poet published in the United Kingdom, published posthumously in July

Works published in other languages

France
 Aimé Césaire, Cahier d'un retour au pays natal ("Notebook of a Return to My Native Land"), a landmark work in French Caribbean literature, which had previously been characterized by literary works derivative of European models and often marked by exoticism; this book-length  poem, according to Bonnie Thomas, "laid the foundations for a new literary style in which Caribbean writers came to reject the alienating gaze of the Other in favour of their own Caribbean interpretation of reality", a change expressed in the theory of négritude; Martinique poet published in France, Volontés (Paris), August; (enlarged edition in book format, 1947; definitive edition, 1956)
 Paul Éluard, pen name of Paul-Eugène Grindel, Chanson complète
 Luc Estang, Transhumances
 Leon-Paul Fargue, Le Piéton de Paris
 Tristan Tzara, Midis gagnés

Indian subcontinent
Including all of the British colonies that later became India, Pakistan, Bangladesh, Sri Lanka and Nepal. Listed alphabetically by first name, regardless of surname:

Urdu
 Akbar Allahabadi, Kulliyat-i Akbar Allahabadi, in four volumes, published (posthumously) from 1935 through this year; Urdu-language
 Mir Hasan, Maghribi tasanif ke Urdu tarajim, treatise in Urdu on the difficulties of translating Western literature into the Urdu language; one of the earlier studies of translation into any Indian language
 Muhammad Tahir Farooqi, Sirat-i Iqbal, biography of Muhammad Iqbal, with appraisals of his poetry
 Nushur Vahidi, Sabha-i Hindi, mostly traditional poems; Urdu

Other Indian languages
 Baikunthanath Pattnayak, Myttika Darsana, long elegy on the death of his son; Oriya
 Balamani Amma, Strihrdayam ("The Heart of a Woman"), Malayalam
 Bapiraju, Ssikala, love poems; Telugu
 Changampuzha Krishna Pillai, Rahtapuspangal, includes Vazhakkula ("A Bunch of Bananas"), which exerted a strong influence on revolutionary Malayalam poetry in the next few decades
 Khalairakpam Chaoba, Thainagi Leirang ("Ancient Flowers"), Meitei
 Mahjoor, Payam-e Mahjoor, popular lyrics; Kashmiri
 Rameshvar Shukla, Aparajita Indian poetry, Hindi-language
 Sundaram, Vasudha, poems about social change and reflecting the influence of Mohandas Karamchand Gandhi on Indian society; Gujarati
 Suryakant Tripathi 'Nirala', Tulsidas, long poem on the life and characteristics of Tulsidas, Hindi
 U. M. Dandpota, Abyat-i-Sindhi, critical appraisal in Sindhi of the Sindhi couplets of Kkwaja Muhammad Zaman (1713–1774)
 Umashankar Joshi, Nishith, lyrics, songs, sonnets and longer poems; received the Bharatiya Jnanpith Award in 1968; Gujarati
 Visvanatha Satyanarayana, Srimad Ramayana Kalpavrksamu, the author's magnum opus, according to Indian literary scholar Siser Kumar Das; it won the Jnanapith Award; a free rendering of the Ramayana; the first canto was published in 1930, the last in 1957; Telugu

Other languages
 Tove Ditlevsen, Pigesind and Slangen i Paradiset, Denmark
 José Gorostiza, Muerte sin fin ("Death without end"), Mexico
 W. J. Hartmann, comp., Sie alle fielen: Gedichte europäischer Soldaten ("They all fell in battle: poems of European soldiers"), translations into German
 D. Gwenallt Jones, Ysgubau'r Awen, Welsh poet published in the United Kingdom
 Eugenio Montale, Le occasioni ("The Occasions"), Turin: Einaudi; Italy
 César Vallejo, posthumously published (died in 1936), Peru:
 Poemas humanos ("Human Poems")
 Sermón de la barbarie ("Sermon on Barbarism")

Awards and honors

 Governor General's Award, poetry or drama: Under the Sun, Arthur S. Bourinot (Canada)

United States
 American Academy of Arts and Letters Gold Medal for Poetry: Robert Frost
 Pulitzer Prize for Poetry: John Gould Fletcher: Selected Poems

Births
Death years link to the corresponding "[year] in poetry" article:
 January 10 – Jared Carter, American poet, winner of the 1980 Walt Whitman Award
 January 23 – Fred Wah, Chinese-Canadian poet, novelist, and scholar
 February 5 – Siv Cedering (died 2007), Swedish-American poet, painter, sculptor, illustrator, and author
 February 22 – Katerina Anghelaki-Rooke (died 2020), Greek (died 2020)
 February 26 – Clark Coolidge, American
 March 3 – Hans Verhagen (died 2020), Dutch journalist, poet, painter and filmmaker
 March 26 – Patrick Lane (died 2019), Canadian
 April 13 – Seamus Heaney (died 2013), Irish writer and lecturer from Northern Ireland awarded the Nobel Prize in Literature in 1995
 April 16 – Diane Wood Middlebrook, née Helen Diane Wood (died 2008), American poet, academic and biographer
 April 25 – Ted Kooser, American poet and 13th Poet Laureate of the United States, serving two terms from 2004 to 2006
 May 7 – Volker Braun, German
 May 11 – Samih al-Qasim (died 2014), Palestinian
 May 23 – Stanley Plumly (died 2019), American poet and academic
 May 27 – Frank Bidart, American
 May 31 – Al Young (died 2021), American poet, novelist and writer of musical memoirs named poet laureate of California in 2005
 June 6 – Lee Harwood (died 2015), English poet associated with the British Poetry Revival
 June 24 – Stephen Dunn, American poet and winner of the Pulitzer Prize for Poetry
 June 30 – José Emilio Pacheco (died 2014), Mexican poet, essayist, translator, novelist and short story writer
 July 22 – Quincy Troupe, American poet, editor, journalist, and academic
 July 27 – Michael Longley, Northern Irish poet
 August 8 – Dick Allen (died 2017), American poet, literary critic and academic
 August 18 – Sándor Tóth (died 2019), Hungarian poet, journalist and politician
 August 31 – Dennis Lee, Canadian children's writer and poet
 October 7 – Clive James (died 2019), Australian-born writer and poet
 October 24 – Paula Gunn Allen (died 2008), Native American poet, literary critic, activist and novelist
 November 11 – Bimbo Rivas, born Bittman Rivas (died 1992), Puerto Rican-born actor, community activist, director, playwright, poet and teacher
 November 18 – Margaret Atwood, Canadian novelist and poet
 November 23 – Bill Bissett, Canadian poet

Also:
 Charles Boer, American
 Michael Coady, Irish poet, short story writer, local historian, genealogist, photographer, journalist and musician
 Philip Dacey, American
 James L. McMichael, American
 Heather Ross Miller, American poet, author and academic
 Primus St. John, American

Deaths
Birth years link to the corresponding "[year] in poetry" article:
 January 28 – W. B. Yeats (born 1865), Irish poet
 February 2 – Amanda McKittrick Ros (born 1860), Irish novelist and poet noted for her purple style
 February 18 – Okamoto Kanoko 岡本かの子, pen name of Ohnuki Kano, (born 1889) Japanese author, tanka poet and Buddhist scholar in the Taishō and early Shōwa periods; mother of artist Tarō Okamoto
 February 22 – Antonio Machado (born 1875), Spanish poet
 March 7 – Ludwig Fulda (born 1862), German poet and playwright
 March 29 – Tachihara Michizō 立原道造 (born 1914), Japanese poet and architect (surname: Michizō)
 June 14 – Vladislav Khodasevich (born 1886), Russian poet and critic
 July 19 – Rose Hartwick Thorpe (born 1850), American poet
 August 29 – Robin Hyde (born 1906), New Zealand poet

See also

 Poetry
 List of poetry awards
 List of years in poetry

Notes

20th-century poetry
Poetry